Emotion Production (full legal name: Preduzeće za konsalting, proizvodnju radio i televizijskih programa i usluge reklame i propagande Emotion Production d.o.o. Beograd) is a Serbian media company with headquarters in Stari Grad, Belgrade. Emotion produces television content (mostly reality shows).

The company's ownership is 100% by IMGS which is owned by Goran Stamenković.

Projects

In its portfolio it has some of the highest rated reality programmes (both licensed and independent) that air throughout the Balkans such as: Leteći start (on air since 2002), 48 sati svadba (on air since 2004), Big Brother, All You Need Is Love, Big Brother VIP, Operacija trijumf, Uzmi ili ostavi, Wife Swap, Marriage Ref, The Simple Life, Friday Night Project, Ant & Dec's Saturday Night Takeaway, I Love My Country, My Kitchen Rules, Tvoje lice zvuči poznato, etc.

They also produced Žene sa Dedinja, TV Series which aired in the whole Balkans region. Additionally, the company is responsible for putting various individual personalities on the map such as Milan Kalinić, Ana Mihajlovski, Maca Marinković, Marijana Mićić and Katarina Šišmanović. Katarina left the company in November 2012 and Kalinić about a year earlier. Ana and Marijana still host Big Brother, while Maca is mostly active on other projects.

References

External links
 

Companies based in Belgrade
Mass media companies established in 2003
D.o.o. companies in Serbia
Mass media companies of Serbia
Serbian brands
Serbian companies established in 2003